Wangshi is a town under the administration of Haicheng in central Liaoning province, China, located  east of downtown Haicheng. , it has five residential communities and 19 villages under its administration.

See also 
 List of township-level divisions of Liaoning

References 

Towns in Liaoning
Haicheng, Liaoning